The Crowned Clown is a 2019 South Korean television series starring Yeo Jin-goo, Kim Sang-kyung, and Lee Se-young. A remake of the 2012 film Masquerade, the series centers on the tale of a Joseon King and his doppelganger, a clown whom he puts on the throne to escape the intense power struggles afflicting the royal court. It aired from January 7 to March 4, 2019, on tvN.

Synopsis
The story takes place in mid-Joseon period, when upheavals and power struggles surrounding the throne had reached extremely devastating levels. In order to escape those who plan to assassinate him, the King puts a clown, who looks exactly like him, on the throne. As the clown settles into his role, the palace is upended as the King's enemies are confounded by the imposter's creativity and his ever-expanding circle of allies, who are glad to see the “King” finally become the ruler they have always wanted.

Cast

Main
 Yeo Jin-goo as Ha-seon, the clown / Yi Heon, the King 
 Kim Sang-kyung as Yi Kyu (Haksan), the Chief Royal Secretary
 Lee Se-young as Yoo So-woon, the Queen

Supporting

People around Ha-seon
 Jang Gwang as Eunuch Jo
 Yoon Jong-suk as Jang Moo-young, a military officer
 Shin Soo-yeon as Dal-rae, Ha-seon's sister and fellow performer
 Yoon Kyung-ho as Kap-soo, Ha-seon and Dal-rae's elder performer

People around So-woon
 Oh Ha-nee as Ae-young, a maid
 Kim Soo-jin as Court Lady Park

People around Yi Heon
 Kwon Hae-hyo as Shin Chi-soo, the Left State Councillor
 Jang Young-nam as the Queen Dowager
 Lee Moo-saeng as Prince Jinpyung
 Min Ji-ah as Court Lady Kim
 Choi Kyu-jin as Shin Yi-kyeom, Shin Chi-soo's son and a member of the Office of Censors
 Seo Yoon-ah as Seon Hwa-dang, Shin Chi-soo's niece and Yi Heon's favourite concubine
 Lee Mi-eun as Court Lady Jang 
 Park Si-eun as Choi Kye-hwan, a 15-year-old kitchen maid

People around Yi Kyu
 Jung Hye-young as Woon-sim, a courtesan
 Lee Yoon-gun as Yoo Ho-joon, So-woon's father
 Lee Kyu-han as Joo Ho-geol
 Choi Moo-in as Lee Han-jong
 Lee Chang-jik as Seo Jang-won
 Song Duk-ho as Woo Jeong-rim
 Jang Sung-won as Jung Saeng, a Buddhist monk

Special appearances
 Jang Hyuk as King Seonjo, Yi Heon's father (Episode 1)
 Yoon Park as Lord Kiseong (Episode 16)

Production
The first script reading took place on October 8, 2018, in Sangam-dong, Seoul, South Korea.

Original soundtrack

Part 1

Part 2

Part 3

Part 4

Part 5

Part 6

Part 7

Part 8

Ratings

Awards and nominations

References

External links
  
 
 

2019 South Korean television series debuts
2019 South Korean television series endings
Korean-language television shows
TVN (South Korean TV channel) television dramas
South Korean historical television series
Television series by Studio Dragon
Television series set in the Joseon dynasty